is a former Japanese football player. He is the twin brother of Koji Morisaki.

Club career
Morisaki was born in Hiroshima on 9 May 1981. He joined J1 League club Sanfrecce Hiroshima from youth team in 1999. He debuted in November 1999 and played many matches as central midfielder for a long time from 2000. He was selected Rookie of the Year award in 2000. Although Sanfrecce played in J2 League in 2003 and 2008, played in J1 for a long time. In late in his career, Sanfrecce won the champions in 2012, 2013 and 2015 J1 League. However he could not play many matches from 2017 and retired end of 2018 season.

National team career
In June 2001, Morisaki was selected Japan U-20 national team for 2001 World Youth Championship. At this tournament, he played full time in all 3 matches.

Club statistics
Updated to 23 December 2018.

1Includes Japanese Super Cup, FIFA Club World Cup and J.League Championship.

Honors and awards

Club
Sanfrecce Hiroshima
J1 League: 2012, 2013, 2015
J2 League: 2008
Japanese Super Cup: 2008, 2013, 2016

Individual
J.League Rookie of the Year: 2000

National team Career Stats

Appearances in Major Competitions

References

External links

1981 births
Living people
Association football people from Hiroshima Prefecture
Japanese footballers
Japan youth international footballers
J1 League players
J2 League players
Sanfrecce Hiroshima players
Asian Games medalists in football
Footballers at the 2002 Asian Games
Asian Games silver medalists for Japan
Association football midfielders
Twin sportspeople
Japanese twins
Medalists at the 2002 Asian Games